Johannes Enckhausen, also Johann Enckhausen and Johann Enckhusen, (born 1676 in Ebstorf; died 1758). was a German Evangelical Clergyman and Superintendent.

Life 
In 1701 Enckhausen worked at the church St. Marien in Uelzen, from 1710 as Superintendent in Sulingen and from 1734 as such in Sievershausen, where he still lived in 1750.

Web Links 
 
 Johann Enckhusen, Gemeinsamer Verbundkatalog (German)

References 

1676 births
1757 deaths
17th-century German Lutheran clergy
18th-century German Lutheran clergy